Cannon is an unincorporated community in Sussex County, Delaware, United States. Cannon is located on Delaware Route 18 south of Bridgeville.

History
Cannon's population was 25 in 1890, 16 in 1900, and 150 in 1960.

References

Unincorporated communities in Sussex County, Delaware
Unincorporated communities in Delaware